George William Albert Chapman, né George William Alphred (13 December 1850 – 23 February 1917), was a Canadian poet.

Chapman was born at Saint-François-de-Beauce, Quebec (today's Beauceville), and was educated at Levis College in 1862-1867. He studied law, afterward engaged in commercial pursuits, and later entered the civil service of the Province of Quebec. Chapman worked for some time as a journalist in Quebec City and Montreal; but in 1902 became a French translator for the Dominion Senate and removed to Ottawa, Ontario.

After his death in 1917, he was entombed at the Notre Dame des Neiges Cemetery in Montreal.

Selected bibliography
Les Québécoises (1876)
Mines d'or de la Beauce (1881)
Guide et souvenir de la St-Jean-Baptiste (1884), Montréal
Les Feuilles d'érable (1890)
Le lauréat (1894)
Les deux Copains (1894)
Les aspirations : poésies canadiennes (1904), which received the highest prize of the Académie française
Les Rayons du Nord (1910), which also gained the highest prize of the Académie française
Les Fleurs de givre (1912)

References

W. H. New, ed. Encyclopedia of Literature in Canada. Toronto: University of Toronto Press, 2002: 191.

External links
 
 
Biography at the Dictionary of Canadian Biography Online

19th-century Canadian poets
Canadian male poets
20th-century Canadian poets
20th-century Canadian male writers
1850 births
1917 deaths
Journalists from Quebec
Writers from Quebec
Anglophone Quebec people
19th-century Canadian male writers
Canadian male non-fiction writers
Burials at Notre Dame des Neiges Cemetery